The growth function, also called the shatter coefficient or the shattering number, measures the richness of a set family. It is especially used in the context of statistical learning theory, where it measures the complexity of a hypothesis class.
The term 'growth function' was coined by Vapnik and Chervonenkis in their 1968 paper, where they also proved many of its properties.
It is a basic concept in machine learning.

Definitions

Set-family definition 
Let  be a set family (a set of sets) and  a set. Their intersection is defined as the following set-family:

If a set  has  elements then the index is at most .

Formally:

Hypothesis-class definition 
Equivalently, let  be a hypothesis-class (a set of binary functions) and  a set with  elements.

Examples 
1. The domain is the real line . 
Therefore: . The same is true whether  contains open half-lines, closed half-lines, or both.

2. The domain is the segment . 
The set-family  contains all the open sets. 
There are  such subsets, so .

3. The domain is the Euclidean space . 
The set-family  contains all the half-spaces of the form: , where  is a fixed vector.
Then ,
where Comp is the number of components in a partitioning of an n-dimensional space by m hyperplanes.

4. The domain is the real line .

Polynomial or exponential 
The main property that makes the growth function interesting is that it can be either polynomial or exponential - nothing in-between.

The following is a property of the intersection-size:
 If, for some set  of size , and for some number ,  -
 then, there exists a subset  of size  such that .

This implies the following property of the Growth function.
For every family  there are two cases:
 The exponential case:  identically.

Other properties

Trivial upper bound 
For any finite :

Therefore, the growth function is mainly interesting when  is infinite.

Exponential upper bound 
For any nonempty :

I.e, the growth function has an exponential upper-bound.

If  shatters  of size , then , which is the upper bound.

Cartesian intersection 
Define the Cartesian intersection of two set-families as:
.
Then:

Union 
For every two set-families:

VC dimension 
 In the exponential case   .

So  if-and-only-if .

The growth function can be regarded as a refinement of the concept of VC dimension.

Another connection between the growth function and the VC dimension is given by the Sauer–Shelah lemma:
If , then:
for all : 
In particular, 
for all : 
This upper bound is tight, i.e., for all  there exists  with VC dimension  such that:

Entropy 
While the growth-function is related to the maximum intersection-size,
the entropy is related to the average intersection size:

The intersection-size has the following property. For every set-family :

Hence:

Moreover, the sequence  converges to a constant  when .

Moreover, the random-variable  is concentrated near .

Applications in probability theory 
Let  be a set on which a probability measure  is defined. 

where each element is chosen at random according to the probability measure , independently of the others (i.e., with replacements). For each event , we compare the following two quantities:
 Its probability .
We are interested in the difference, . This difference satisfies the following upper bound:

which is equivalent to:

I.e, the family  enjoys uniform convergence in probability.

References 

Measures of complexity
Statistical classification
Computational learning theory
Families of sets